The Haras national du Pin is a French national stud located in Le Pin-au-Haras district, in the Orne (61) department of the southern Normandy region. It is the oldest of the French "Haras Nationaux" (National Studs).

History 
In 1665, under Louis XIV, Colbert created the royal studs administration in order to overcome 
the lack of horses which then prevailed in the entire kingdom; he also wished to improve French equine breeds. The army was then in dire need of horses, and the kingdom was forced to import them from abroad. As soon as the administration was created, royal stallions were selected and sent out to various areas; they were the only ones allowed to breed. Starting from 1668, the army still lacking in horses, private stallions were also allowed to breed after having been approved of by the State.

The area on which to build the first royal stud was chosen in 1714. The quality of the pastures and the easy access to water made Buisson d'Exmes, near Argentan, the perfect spot. The area was bought from Louis de Béchameil de Nointel, State Counsellor, in exchange for other lands in Picardy. On the 2nd of April 1715, order was given to transfer the haras royal de Saint-Léger to Buisson d'Exmes.

The estate today covers over 2,471 acres. The first stables were built starting from 1715 and the first stallions arrived in 1717. The architectural style is equivalent to the one of the “École de Versailles”, and Pierre Le Mousseux oversaw the works, following plans which had been drawn by Robert de Cotte, first architect to the Crown and the successor of Jules Hardouin-Mansart. The current buildings (both the stables and the castle) were built under the reign of Louis XV, between 1715 and 1730. The writer Jean de La Varende nicknamed it “the Equestrian Versailles”.

Terraces of the castle were put in following the tradition of French formal garden.

On 27 January 1790, the destruction and removal of the “Haras” were voted, but it narrowly escaped this fate, the National Assembly at the very last moment deciding to establish there a “depot of the best stallions in the Kingdom”. Nevertheless, the functions of the Haras were re-established only under the First French Empire, in 1810. The “École des Haras” was founded in 1840, and on 29 May 1874, a law decreed one should have studied there to occupy any function as an officer of the “Haras”.

The stud was occupied by the Prussians in 1871, then by the Germans (June 1940-June 1941). It found itself at the heart of the site of bataille de Normandie, close to Falaise, without sustaining any damages.

The Haras du Pin today 
The change within the Haras nationaux (national studs) took place at the end of 2013, when breeding as such, the core of their function, was transferred to the private sector. However, the Haras national du Pin maintained its breeding activities thanks to a private cooperative of breeders, the SCIC (Cooperative Company of Collective Interest), which brings together various private breeders. The SCIC set their stallions in the 2nd stable. Some National stud stallions were also rented, in order to pursue their breeding career.

The decree of 2 July 2015 created the “Établissement Public Administratif” (a public administrative establishment) named the “Haras national du Pin”: the National Stud was detaching itself from the authority of the IFCE (French Institute for Horses and Riding), in order to be jointly managed by the Orne department, the Basse-Normandie region and the State. The Executive Board is presided by Laurent Beauvais, also Chairman of the Lower Normandy Regional Council.

The grounds of the National Stud stretch over the town of Pin-Au-Haras, but also over the neighbouring ones of Exmes, La Cochère, Silly-en-Gouffern and Ginai. All are classified as historic monuments.

The estate is managed by the "EPA Haras national du Pin", the "IFCE" (French Institute for Horses and Riding), the "ONF" (National Forestry Office) and the "INRA" (National Institute for Agricultural Research), along with an experimental farm with over 1,000 heads of cattle.

In 2019 the IFCE announced it would stop financially supporting the stud (it was paying approximately 75% of the employee salaries) and declared the salary payments would cease as of 2022.

National stud activities

Tourism and culture
The stud welcomes several tens of thousand visitors every year. It offers guided tours of the Haras du Pin, tours of the Haras castle as well as themed tours (saddlery, blacksmithing, horse breeding). The “Discovery Trail” tour of the 1st stable (a horse museum) is available all the year round. The famous “Jeudis du Pin”, or “Thursdays at Le Pin” consist in a presentation of different breeds of horses from the National stud. They take place from June to September. For about ten years now, as well, the Haras du Pin has welcomed each year “artists in residence”. These contribute to the “Jeudis du Pin”, and also offer presentations of their horses on weekends during the spring and summer seasons (from April to September). Temporary exhibits relative to horses are organized each year in the 1st stable. Every year too, the “Septembre musical de l'Orne” (“Musical September of the Orne”) is a festival staging two operas mid-September on the stud's riding-rink.

Sporting Competitions

The site, which stretches over more than 2,471 acres, welcomes each year well-known competitions, especially show-jumping or eventing. The Haras du Pin has always welcomed international competitions (the European combined driving Championship in 1979, the World Congress of Percherons in 1989 and 2011, or the Eventing World Cup in 2010, 2011 and 2012).

In 2014, dressage and cross-country tests for the 2014 World Equestrian Games  Eventing took place in the “Parc du Hautbois”, gathering over 50,000 people.

The main competitions to take place in 2016 included the traditional international combined driving competition (July 9 and 10), the “Grand Complet” (August 16 and 21), the international combined driving competition (August 25 and 28), not forgetting the “Pin Races”, in early May and early October at the Bergerie racecourse (in Ginai).

Training and schooling
The “École Supérieure du Cheval et de l'Équitation” (“Higher School for Horses and Riding”) is present on the Pin site, having at its disposal high quality training in saddlery, blacksmithing, riding of young horses and combined driving.

The broodmare band conducts genetic research on horse breeding. In 2014, four foals, two females and two males, were born from an embryo transfer. This method, the first of its kind in Europe, will enable the maintenance of rare and endangered horse breeds. In 2015, an equine cryobank was implemented.

Heritage and grounds

The castle's terraces: overhanging the Hautbois park, this viewpoint is one of the most beautiful of the estate. From the terraces, the public can admire the riding arena, built in 2014 to host the dressage test of the World Equestrian Games Event of the same year.
The tack room of honour: this room presents a fine collection of carriage-driving harnesses, the craftsmanship of which is identical to that of the 19th century. It includes two types of harnesses: English style collars and breast harnesses. There is also a saddle bought by the studs to equip Ouadoud, a Barb horse stallion offered in 2009 by the King of Morocco, Mohamed VI, to honour Franco-Moroccan cooperation.
Equine breeds
	**Draft horses: the Percherons, from the Perche region, are the star horses of the Pin stud. They are the ones pulling the traditional carriages. Black or grey, these horses weigh between 800 and 1200 kg. At the Pin, they are shown both ridden and in harness, and sometimes presented with 'Hungarian Post' stunts or sidesaddle riding. Exported worldwide, they are especially appreciated in the United States and in Japan. Japan in particular is the only country in the world to organize Percheron races, which gather thousands of spectators and also afford betting occasions.
	**'Hot-blooded' horses: several breeds are noticeable in the stud stables— Arabian horses, Anglo-Arabians, Selle Français, Lipizzans, Hanoverian horses, French Trotters, Thoroughbreds, Andalusian horses...
Horse-drawn cars: The stud owns two warehouses full of collectible horse-drawn vehicles, part of the heritage of the Haras Nationaux. The majority of these vehicles are painted in the colors of the Haras Nationaux: navy-blue and red, with an "H" on the doors. Among those cars is one “Milord” (an elegant variation of the English Cab)— among the four to be found in French public collections; a phaeton; several breaks; a “coupé de voyage”... Those cars ——part of the image of the studs— still carry nowadays all the history and tradition of this three-centuries old institution.
Furioso's grave: the internationally-known horse, Furioso, a Thoroughbred born in 1939, stood as a stallion at the National Pin Stud from 1946 until his death, in 1967. The ancestor of over 300 horses, including Lutteur B (Olympic champion in 1964 with his rider Pierre Jonquères d'Oriola), Furioso today has fathered many lines of jumping horses of exception. As an honour, Furioso was buried on the estate ; since then, his grave has been constantly covered in flowers.

See also 
 Le Pin-au-Haras
 Haras Nationaux (France)
 Haras de la Tuilerie
 Haras national de Pompadour

Notes and references

Notes

References

Official Site

 The Haras national du Pin official site

Further reading

Bibliography 
 Gérard Guillotel, Les Haras nationaux, 3 volumes, Lavauzelle, 1985
 Le Haras national du Pin, Versailles du cheval, collective, coll. « Itinéraires », Patrimoine-Monum editions, 2006
Olivier-Raoul-Hugues Chebrou de Lespinats, Histoire des haras sous le Premier Empire, Memoirs et documents, 2005, preface by Gérard Guillotel
Olivier-Raoul-Hugues Chebrou de Lespinats, Hommes de Chevaux sous le Premier Empire, All-Square Publications, 2009

Partial sources 
 Le « Versailles du cheval », Le Monde, April 1, 2006

18th century in France
Horse farms in France
Animal breeding
Livestock